Hebron station is an A-train commuter rail station in Lewisville, Texas. It is near the interchange between Interstate 35E and the Sam Rayburn Tollway, and serves commuters from Lewisville and the Vista Ridge Mall retail area. It is also the South Lewisville terminal of DCTA's Commuter Express bus route.

Location history

The station is located adjacent to the former site of the festival stage at the Dallas International Motor Speedway, home of the 1969 Texas International Pop Festival.  The Texas Historical Commission approved the placement of a state historical marker near the station to commemorate the event.

References

External links
My A-train, DCTA

A-train (Denton County Transportation Authority) stations
Railway stations in the United States opened in 2011
Railway stations in Denton County, Texas